Syncopating Sue is a 1926 American silent romantic comedy film directed by Richard Wallace and starring Corinne Griffith and Tom Moore. It is based on a 1924 Broadway play, Ashes by Regianld Goode.

Cast

Preservation
With no copies of Syncopating Sue located in any film archives, it is a lost film.

References

External links

Still and posters at silenthollywood.com

1926 films
American silent feature films
Lost American films
American black-and-white films
1926 romantic comedy films
American romantic comedy films
1926 lost films
Films directed by Richard Wallace
1920s American films
Silent romantic comedy films
Silent American comedy films